Gregory Jennings Jr. (born September 21, 1983) is an American former professional football player who was a wide receiver for 10 seasons in the National Football League (NFL), primarily with the Green Bay Packers. He played college football at Western Michigan and was selected by Green Bay in the second round of the 2006 NFL Draft. Jennings was named to two Pro Bowls during his seven seasons with the Packers and was part of the team that won a Super Bowl title in Super Bowl XLV. In his final three seasons, he was a member of the Minnesota Vikings and Miami Dolphins. He was inducted into Green Bay Packers Hall of Fame in 2022.

Early years
Jennings was born in Kalamazoo, Michigan.  He attended Kalamazoo Central High School where he was all conference in three sports—football, basketball, and track. Jennings played wide receiver, running back, outside linebacker and defensive back as a four-time letterman for the football team.  He was listed 11th on the "Fab 50" rankings of the Detroit Free Press as a senior.  Jennings finished seventh in voting for Mr. Basketball of Michigan in 2000–01 and scored a school record 50 points in a losing effort against Benton Harbor as a senior.

In track & field, Jennings was one of the state's top performers in the long jump event. He captured the state title in the long jump at the 2001 MHSAA State LP-1 Championships, with a leap of 6.67 meters. He got a PR of 6.92 meters in the long jump. He was also a member of the 4 × 100m (42.20) and 4 × 200m (1:28.50) relay squads.

College career
Jennings attended Western Michigan University and played for the Broncos. He finished his career there with 238 receptions for 3,539 yards and 39 touchdowns. When Jennings was a redshirt freshman, he missed 8 games due to a broken ankle bone. In the 8 games he did play, he caught 10 passes for 138 yards. In 2003, he was second on the Broncos with 56 catches for 1,050 yards and 14 touchdowns. He finished the 2003 season with 1,734 all-purpose yards. He was named to the All-Mid American 2nd team. In 2004, he led the Broncos with 74 catches for 1,092 yards and 11 touchdowns. He tallied 1,415 all-purpose yards. He was named to the All-MAC team. In 2005, he had 98 catches, and led the nation in catches per game, with 8.91.  He had 1,259 yards with 14 touchdowns, and earned the 2005 MAC Offensive Player of the Year Award. His 5,093 all-purpose yards is a WMU record, and ranks 8th in MAC history.  Jennings became only the 11th player to gain over 1,000 yards in at least three seasons of a college career. He also competed on their debate team, becoming President of the American Parliamentary Debate Association his junior year. Jennings graduated from WMU in 2010 after completing the 16 credits he needed through self-instructional classes.

Professional career

Green Bay Packers
The Green Bay Packers drafted Jennings in the second round (52nd pick overall) of the 2006 NFL draft. On July 24, 2006, he signed a contract with the Packers.

Jennings was named the starting wide receiver, along with Donald Driver, which put Robert Ferguson in the slot, for his first professional regular-season game Green Bay Packers by head coach Mike McCarthy on September 2, 2006. Jennings led the NFL in receiving yardage during the 2006 preseason. He had 1 catch for 5 yards in his first game.

On September 24, 2006, he caught a 75-yard touchdown pass from Brett Favre against the Detroit Lions. It was Favre's 400th touchdown pass for his career, a milestone reached only by Favre, Dan Marino, Peyton Manning, Tom Brady, Drew Brees, Philip Rivers and Aaron Rodgers. This was also Jennings's first 100-plus-yard game, as he finished with 3 catches, 101 yards and 1 touchdown. Jennings was voted NFL Rookie of the Week for games played September 24–25, 2006, the only time he received this honor. Jennings was also named to the NFL All Rookie team at the end of the season.

On September 23, 2007, Jennings caught a game-winning 57-yard TD pass from Favre with less than two minutes to play to help beat the San Diego Chargers 31–24 at Lambeau Field and improve the team's record to 3–0 in 2007. This was Jennings' first touchdown catch in 2007, as well as Favre's 420th career touchdown pass, tying him with Marino for the most TD passes in NFL history.

A week later on September 30, 2007, during a 23–16 victory over the Minnesota Vikings, Jennings caught a 16-yard pass from Favre that opened the scoring ten minutes into the first quarter, and broke the all-time touchdown pass record Favre had shared with Dan Marino. On October 29, 2007, Jennings caught an 82-yard touchdown pass from Favre to defeat the Denver Broncos 19–13 in overtime, tying him for the second-longest overtime touchdown in NFL history.  Then the following week, he caught the game-winning touchdown pass that went for 60 yards to beat the Chiefs in Kansas City.  Against the Cowboys on November 29, 2007, in a game broadcast on the NFL Network, Jennings hauled in the first ever touchdown pass by quarterback Aaron Rodgers.

Jennings and running back Ryan Grant each had a touchdown during a 33–14 victory over the St. Louis Rams on December 16, 2007, making it the first time two Packers players have each scored a touchdown in the same four consecutive games. Jennings collected 80 receptions for 1292 yards and 9 touchdowns in the 2008 season.

On June 23, 2009, Jennings received a new three-year extension which paid him $26.35 million and included $16 million guaranteed. It also included a $11.25 million signing bonus.  Jennings caught a game-winning pass on September 13, 2009, on a 3rd and two play, where the Packers ran a play action fake and rolled Aaron Rodgers out to the left, who then threw a 50-yard pass to Jennings to defeat the Chicago Bears in the season opener. In the Packers 2009 Wild Card game against the Arizona Cardinals, Jennings had 8 receptions for 130 yards, scoring 1 touchdown.
In the 2010–2011 season, Jennings helped the Packers go 10–6 in the regular season.
In Super Bowl XLV, on February 6, 2011, Jennings caught four passes for 64 yards and scored two touchdowns in the Packers' 31–25 victory over the Pittsburgh Steelers.

Jennings played the first 13 games of the 2011 season before going down with a sprained MCL in week 13 against the Oakland Raiders. During the season, he collected 69 receptions for 949 yards, including a season-high 149 yards on 7 receptions, and a touchdown in a week 7 game at the Minnesota Vikings.  He returned for the Packers' divisional round playoff game against the New York Giants and recorded 4 receptions for 40 yards in a Packers' loss.

In 2012, Jennings sat out most of the early season due to a groin injury, and was scheduled to have surgery in Philadelphia, but it was postponed due to Hurricane Sandy.

Minnesota Vikings

On March 15, 2013, Jennings signed a 5-year, $47.5 million ($18 million guaranteed) contract with the Minnesota Vikings. Jennings got his first two touchdowns as a member of the Vikings against the Pittsburgh Steelers in a 34–27 win. Jennings made his first return to Lambeau Field on November 24, 2013 in a 26–26 tie between the Packers and Vikings.

He was released by the Vikings on March 14, 2015.

Miami Dolphins
On April 22, 2015, Jennings signed a two-year, $8 million contract with the Miami Dolphins.

On March 5, 2016, the Dolphins released Jennings to free up cap space.

Retirement
On July 25, 2016, Jennings retired from professional football after 10 seasons at the age of 32.

For his accomplishments in Green Bay, was inducted to the Green Bay Packers Hall of Fame in 2022.

NFL career statistics
Regular season

Playoffs

Source:Pro-Football-Reference.com

Personal life
Jennings is a Christian. Jennings is married to Nicole Jennings, also of Kalamazoo, and they have three daughters named Amya, Alea and Ayva. On October 5, 2012, they welcomed their son Aice Gregory.

On May 5, 2010, Jennings made an appearance on the CBS prime time hit show Criminal Minds. He portrayed a lab technician working at a crime scene. Jennings is also in discussions to appear on BET's The Game. He appeared as himself on the July 6, 2011, episode of Royal Pains and the 2013 The League episode, "The Near Death Flex-perience". He is also the main actor and star of Old Spice 'Smelf' ad campaign.

The Greg Jennings Foundation was started by Jennings to attempt to benefit underprivileged children and youth organizations. The entire charity organization raises money through organizational events, donations, and fund raisers. The organization allows people, groups, and organizations from either Michigan or Wisconsin to apply for grant money. The headquarters of the foundation are in Kalamazoo, Michigan.

See also
 List of NCAA major college football yearly receiving leaders

References

External links

 
 Green Bay Packers biography 
 The Greg Jennings Foundation

1983 births
African-American players of American football
American football wide receivers
Fox Sports 1 people
Green Bay Packers players
Living people
Miami Dolphins players
Minnesota Vikings players
National Football League announcers
People from De Pere, Wisconsin
Players of American football from Michigan
Sportspeople from Kalamazoo, Michigan
Western Michigan Broncos football players
21st-century African-American sportspeople
20th-century African-American people
National Conference Pro Bowl players
Ed Block Courage Award recipients